Charles Noel may refer to:
Charles Noel, 1st Earl of Gainsborough (1781–1866), aka Charles Edwardes and Lord Barham; British peer and Whig politician
Charles Noel, 2nd Earl of Gainsborough (1818–1881), aka Viscount Campden, British peer and Whig politician
Charles Noel, 3rd Earl of Gainsborough (1850–1926), British peer and Member of Parliament

See also

Noel (surname)